A depsipeptide is a peptide in which one or more of its amide, -C(O)NHR-, groups are replaced by the corresponding ester, -C(O)OR-. Many depsipeptides have both peptide and ester linkages. Elimination of the N–H group in a peptide structure results in a decrease of H-bonding capability, which is responsible for secondary structure and folding patterns of peptides, thus inducing structural deformation of the helix and b-sheet structures. Because of decreased resonance delocalization in esters relative to amides, depsipeptides have lower rotational barriers for cis-trans isomerization and therefore they have more flexible structures than their native analogs. They are mainly found in marine and microbial natural products.

Depsipeptide natural products

Several depsipeptides have been found to exhibit anti-cancer properties.

A depsipeptide enzyme inhibitor includes romidepsin, a member of the bicyclic peptide class, a known histone deacetylase inhibitors (HDACi). It was first isolated as a fermentation product from Chromobacterium violaceum by the Fujisawa Pharmaceutical Company.

Etamycin was shown in preliminary data in 2010 to have potent activity against MRSA in a mouse model. Several depsipeptides from Streptomyces exhibit antimicrobial activity. These form a new, potential class of antibiotics known as acyldepsipeptides (ADEPs). ADEPs target and activate the casein lytic protease (ClpP) to initiate uncontrolled peptide and unfolded protein degradation, killing many Gram-positive bacteria.

Depsipeptides can be formed through a Passerini reaction.

References

Further reading
papuamide 
neamphamide A 
callipeltin A 
mirabamides A-D ; 

Biomolecules